opened in Abeno-ku, Ōsaka, Japan, in 2014. Specializing in temporary exhibitions, it is located on the 16th floor of Abeno Harukas, Japan's tallest building, named after the ward of Abeno and the expression , meaning 'brightening up'. The Museum's inaugural director is art historian , director of Kintetsu Railway Company's other cultural initiative, the Yamato Bunkakan.

List of exhibitions
Exhibitions have had as their subject:

2014: Tōdai-ji; Collection of Museo Poldi Pezzoli; Dufy; Neo-impressionism
2015: Treasures from Mount Kōya; ; Treasures from Kotohira-gū; Tove Jansson; Ukiyo-e from the Philadelphia Museum of Art; Museum of Magic
2016: Museum of Magic; Treasures from Hase-dera; Picasso; Star Wars; Yōkai; Munakata Shikō
2017: Munakata Shikō; Renoir; Matisse and Roualt; ; Treasures from Saidai-ji; Hokusai (with the British Museum); Studio Ghibli
2018: Studio Ghibli; Tōgō Seiji; Works by Harunobu from the Museum of Fine Arts, Boston; Learn and Play!; Tower of the Sun; Works by M. C. Escher from the Israel Museum, Jerusalem
2019: Works by M. C. Escher from the Israel Museum, Jerusalem; Japanese crafts from the Meiji period to today; Winnie the Pooh; Gustave Moreau; The Pre-Raphaelites; Caravaggio
2020: Caravaggio; Treasures from Yakushi-ji; Anno Mitsumasa

See also
 Yamato Bunkakan

References

External links
  Abeno Harukas Art Museum

Art museums and galleries in Osaka
Art museums established in 2014
2014 establishments in Japan
Kintetsu Railway
Kintetsu Group Holdings
Abeno-ku, Osaka